The Report of the International Commission to Inquire into the Causes and Conduct of the Balkan Wars is a document published in Washington D.C. in 1914 by the Carnegie Endowment for International Peace.

The International Commission consisted of university professors and other prominent individuals from France, Great Britain, United States, Germany, Austria and Russia. Among the members of the Commission there were three Nobel Prize winners.

The Commission went to the participating countries at the beginning of August 1913 and remained until the end of September. After returning to Paris all the material was processed and released in the form of a detailed report. The report speaks of the numerous violations of international conventions and war crimes committed during the Balkan Wars. The information collected was published by the Endowment in the early summer of 1914, but was soon overshadowed by the beginning of the First World War.

According to Mark Levene in 2020, the report is "thoroughly documented and still highly regarded".

Members of the Commission 

Josef Redlich (Austria-Hungary, professor of law at the University of Vienna)
 Walther Schücking (Germany, professor of public international law,  the first German judge at the Permanent Court of International Justice in The Hague)
 Francis Wrigley Hirst (United Kingdom, editor of The Economist)
 Henry Noel Brailsford (United Kingdom, journalist)
 Paul-Henri-Benjamin Balluet d'Estournelles (France, senator, winner of the 1909 Nobel Prize for Peace)
 Justin Godart (France, politician, French National Assembly)
 Pavel Milyukov (Russia, historian, member of State Duma) 
Samuel Train Dutton  (Columbia University, United States).

References

External links 
  

Balkan Wars
War crimes
1914 documents
1914 in military history
Reports